is one of the sources of pronunciation of Japanese kanji. They were borrowed during the Tang dynasty (7th to 9th century), introduced by, among others, envoys from Japanese missions to Tang China. This period corresponds with the Japanese Nara period. Not to be confused with Tō-on "Tang sound", which actually refers to later phonetic loans.

Kan-on is based on the central Chang'an pronunciation of Middle Chinese. The name Kan could refer to the Han dynasty, which also had Chang'an as its capital city. Furthermore, Kan has also become a description for all things Chinese, e.g., Kanji ('Chinese characters').

Kan'on partly displaced the earlier go'on, which were "just imitations of Korean imitations, but Kan-on were imitations of the real things."

A minority of characters never had their Kan-on transmitted to Japan; their Kan-on are sometimes reconstructed in Japanese dictionaries although not specifically marked as such. A few dictionaries go as far as to discard attested Kan-on in favour of more systematic pronunciations.

Characteristics as compared to Go-on

In consonants

In vowels

See also 
 Go-on
 Tō-on
 On'yomi
 Checked tone

References

Kanji